The Commander-in-Chief of the Royal Thai Army is headquartered in Bangkok. The commander of the Royal Thai Army is a powerful position that has at times been the springboard to the premiership. Prior to 1932, the post of Commander of the Siamese Army was combined with that of the Kalahom Department. The Commander-in-Chief of the Royal Thai Army is regarded as the most prestigious Thai military position since he commands the largest force of Thailand.

The following individuals have commanded the Royal Thai Army:

Royal Siamese Army

Royal Thai Army

See also
Royal Thai Army
Head of the Royal Thai Armed Forces
Chief of Defence Forces (Thailand)
List of commanders-in-chief of the Royal Thai Navy
List of commanders-in-chief of the Royal Thai Air Force

References

www.rta.mi.th

External links
 Website of the Royal Thai Army (in Thai)

Royal Thai Army
Army Commanders
List
Thailand